Cave-Shrine of Chinguaro is a Roman Catholic church and cave located in Güímar on Tenerife (Canary Islands, Spain). It was the traditional palace of the Guanche King of the Menceyato de Güímar, Acaimo.

In this cave, the ancient Guanches worshiped the Virgin of Candelaria (Patron Saint of the Canary Islands) as the goddess Chaxiraxi of their traditional faith. This deity was worshiped in the Canary Islands until the Castillian conquest of the archipelago. The icon was later identified with the Virgin Mary and was moved by the Guanches themselves to the Cave of Achbinico in Candelaria. This cave was the first shrine devoted to the Virgin of Candelaria, and the first aboriginal Guanche shrine to contain a Christian idol in the Canary Islands. However, the Guanches at the time still generally adhered to their traditional religion.

The cave is also a place of great archaeological importance.

See also 
Church of the Guanche People
La Laguna Cathedral

References 
Cueva de Chinguaro

Guanche
Churches in Tenerife
Catholic Church in the Canary Islands
Cave churches
Tenerife
Caves of the Canary Islands
Bien de Interés Cultural landmarks in the Province of Santa Cruz de Tenerife
Archaeology of Tenerife